Kayah State (formerly Karenni State) is a state of Myanmar. Situated in eastern Myanmar, it is bounded on the north by Shan State, on the east by Thailand's Mae Hong Son Province, and on the south and west by Kayin State. It lies approximately between 18° 30′ and 19° 55′ north latitude and between 96° 50′ and 97° 50′ east longitude. Its capital is Loikaw (also spelt Loi-kaw). The estimated population in 1998 was approximately 207,357, according to UNICEF. It is inhabited primarily by the Karenni ethnic group, also known as Red Karen or Kayah, a Sino-Tibetan people.

Geography 
Karenni (Kayah) State is located in the eastern part of Myanmar. The relief of Karenni (Kayah) State is mountainous with the Dawna Range and the Karen Hills also known as "Karenni-Karen" mountains separated by the Salween River as it flows through Karenni (Kayah) State. Balu Chaung flows from Inle Lake to Than Lwin River and converges with the Salween in southern Karenni (Kayah) State.

Lawpita Dam, built in 1950 as a bilateral reparation agreement with Japan, is a major hydroelectric production dam which produces a quarter of the total hydroelectric power generation in Myanmar.

History

19th century and British rule

Karenni States is the name formerly given to a group of states that included Kantarawadi, Kyebogyi and Bawlake. These states were located south of the Federated Shan States and east of British Burma. According to the 1930 census, the states had a total population of 58,761 with Kantarawadi, 30,677, Kyebogyi, 14,282 and Bawlake, 13,802.

The British government recognised and guaranteed the independence of the Karenni States in an 1875 treaty with Burmese King Mindon Min, by which both parties recognised the area as belonging neither to Konbaung Burma nor to Great Britain. Consequently, the Karenni States were never fully incorporated into British Burma. The Karenni States were recognised as tributary to British Burma in 1892, when their rulers agreed to accept a stipend from the British government. In the 1930s, the Mawchi Mine in Bawlake was the most important source of tungsten in the world.

Independence to 1988

The Constitution of the Union of Burma in 1947 proclaimed that the three Karenni States be amalgamated into a single constituent state of the union, called Karenni State. It also provided for the possibility of secession from the Union after 10 years.

In August 1948, the Karenni leader U Bee Htu Re was assassinated by central government militia for his opposition to the inclusion of the Karenni States in the Union of Burma. An armed uprising swept the state that has continued to the present day.

In 1952, the former Shan state of Mong Pai (1901. pop - 19,351) was added to Karenni State, and the whole renamed Kayah State, possibly with the intent of driving a wedge between the Karenni (in Kayah State) and the rest of the Karen people (in Karen State), both fighting for independence.

In 1957, pro-independence groups already active in the area formed the Karenni National Progressive Party (KNPP), backed by its own army, the Karenni Army (KA). Apart from a brief ceasefire in 1995, the KA has been fighting ever since. Rivals to the KNPP include the leftist Kayan New Land Party (KNLP), and the Karenni National People's Liberation Front (KNPLF), both of which are now allied with the Myanmar military.

Post-1988

In 1996, Myanmar's State Law and Order Restoration Council (SLORC) of stepped up its campaign to crush Karenni independence with a population transfer program, forcibly moving villagers to designated relocation sites to deprive the pro-independence forces of bases of support. The Myanmar government has been accused of massive human rights violations in the region.

Demographics

Ethnographers classify anywhere from seven to ten ethnic groups (not including ethnic sub-groups) as native to Kayah State. In addition, Shan, Intha, and Bamar live in the north and Pa-O in surrounding hills. Each group is also known by more than one name. Clearly, ethnicity in Kayah State is a complex issue, made more complex by the current political situation. According to the 1983 census conducted by United Nations and the Burmese government, the Kayah composed 56.12%, while Bamar (17.58%), Shan (16.66%), Karen (6.45%), mixed races (2.08%), and other groups formed minorities. Ethnolinguists distinguish the following linguistic groups in Kayah State:
 Karenni/Kayah (Red people)
 Padaung (Kayan)
 Bwe
 Geba
 Manumanaw (Kayaw)
 Yantale
 Zayein (Kayăn Lahta)
 Geko (Kayăn Kakhong)
 Yinbaw (Kayăn Kangan)
 Paku (Karen)

Religion

According to the 2014 Myanmar Census, Buddhists, who make up 49.9% of Kayah State's population, form the largest religious community there. Minority religious communities include Christians (45.8%), Muslims (1.1%), Hindus (0.1%), and animists (1.9%) who collectively comprise the remainder of Kayah State's population. 1.2% of the population listed no religion, other religions, or were otherwise not enumerated.

According to the State Sangha Maha Nayaka Committee’s 2016 statistics, 2060 Buddhist monks were registered in Kayah State, comprising 0.4% of Myanmar's total Sangha membership, which includes both novice samanera and fully-ordained bhikkhu. The majority of monks belong to the Thudhamma Nikaya (82.4%), followed by Shwegyin Nikaya (17.6%), with the remainder of monks belonging to other small monastic orders. 303 thilashin were registered in Kayah State, comprising 0.5% of Myanmar’s total thilashin community.

The Kayans’ traditional religion is called Kan Khwan, and has been practised since the people migrated from Mongolia during the Bronze Age.  It includes the belief that the Kayan people are the result of a union between a female dragon and a male human/angel hybrid.

The major religious festival is the three-day Kay Htein Bo festival, which commemorates the belief that the creator god gave form to the world by planting a small post in the ground. During this festival, held in late March or early April, a Kay Htoe Boe pole is erected and participants dance around the pole. This festival is held to venerate the eternal god and creator messengers, to give thanks for blessings during the year, to appeal for forgiveness, and pray for rain. It is also an opportunity for Kayan from different villages to come together to maintain the solidarity of the tribe.

The Kayan have a strong belief in augury and nothing is done without reference to some form of divination, including breaking thatch grass, but most importantly consulting the chicken bones.
Nowadays the annual Kay Htein Bo festival is always accompanied by a reading of the chicken bones to predict the year ahead. Fowl bone prognostication can be witnessed in the Kayan villages in Thailand's Mae Hong Son province during the annual festival and during “Cleansing Ceremonies” which are held when a family has encountered misfortune. Dreams are also used to make predictions.

Politics 
As with many other states in Myanmar, which have ethnic minority populations, Kayah state has its own fair share of alleged human rights abuses by the Burmese military junta and the Burmese armed forces.

It has been alleged that villagers live under the constant threat of rape, beatings, arbitrary arrest or execution, conscription as slave labour for the Myanmar army, and having their food and possessions taken without compensation.
"The SPDC also arbitrarily closes roads for non-military travel in Karenni State,
further restricting villagers movements. Landmines are often planted along roads to prohibit the villagers' movements. Villagers, fearful of landmines and potentialinjuries, further restrict their own movements.

Even with a valid travel pass villagers are still vulnerable to abuses and exploitation. There have been reports of arrests, torture, extrajudicial killings and rapes of villagers who have had permission to travel. Villagers have also been shot at when they have been outside of their communities."
It has also been alleged that the relocation centers have inadequate access to water, food, medical services, and educational facilities. An estimated 50,000 Karenni people classified as IDPs (Internally Displaced Persons) and thousands more are in refugee camps in Thailand.
"Currently there are 4,800 IDPs in eight forced relocation sites throughout Karenni
State. These relocation sites are a result of the Burmese military regimes mass
relocation program in Karenni State in 1996. Following the collapse of the
ceasefire between SLORC and the KNPP, tens of thousands of people were
forcibly evicted from their homes during this program.

"Most relocation sites are located close to military camps, army bases and along
main roads. This increases the vulnerability of exploitation and abuse. IDPs are
subjected to force labour demands from the soldiers and arbitrary taxation
(essentially theft). IDPs are also vulnerable to torture; murder and rape by soldiers
and their movements are heavily restricted.

"The relocation sites are also inadequate to sustain a healthy and economically
viable livelihood. The majority of relocation sites do not have sanitation facilities,
electricity or access to safe drinking water. The land surrounding the sites is
often barren and over populated. As productive land has usually been claimed by
the original inhabitants or confiscated by the soldiers, opportunities to farm are
limited. There are also very few employment opportunities in forced relocation
sites."

Administration
The state capital is Loikaw. The state is divided into 4 districts which are divided into 7 townships with 106 wards and villages.

Districts

Townships

Towns

 Bawlakhe
 Demoso
 Hpasawng
 Hpruso
Lawpita
 Loikaw
Loilinlay
Mawchi
 Mese
Nanmekon
 Shadaw
Ywathit

Government

Executive

Legislature

Judiciary
Kayah State High Court

Transport
Kayah State is served by Loikaw Airport and Loikaw Train station

Economy

Kayah State has a primarily extraction-based economy. The main crop is rice, mostly irrigated, with other important crops including millet, maize, sesame, groundnut, garlic, and vegetables. Mineral products include alabaster, tin, and tungsten. Valuable woods such as teak and pine were once produced, but the forests have largely been stripped bare by illegal logging authorised by the Tatmadaw (Burmese military). The hydroelectric power plant at Lawpita Falls outside of Loikaw is of strategic importance, as it supplies over 20% of Myanmar's total electrical power.

Kayah State has theoretical tourist potential, if the political situation is resolved. The state has rugged mountains, river streams, lakes and waterfalls; however, transport and communication are difficult. At present, Kayah State is open to outsiders by permit only, which can be difficult to obtain depending on the current military situation. Even with a permit, usually only a  radius around Loikaw is allowed. The central government effectively controls only Loikaw and parts of the western half of the state.
16 January 2012

As of 2018, the state is the most electrified in Myanmar, at 87%.

Education

 Loikaw University
 Technological University, Loikaw
 Computer University, Loikaw

Educational opportunities in Myanmar are extremely limited outside the main cities of Yangon and Mandalay. According to official statistics, Kayah State has the lowest number of public schools in the country. Loikaw University is the state's main university.

Health care
Kayah State, most of Myanmar, has poor health care facilities due to the alleged mismanagement by the Burmese military junta and economic sanctions by the US government. Although health care is nominally free, in reality patients have to pay for medicine and treatment even in public clinics and hospitals. Public hospitals lack many of the basic facilities and equipment. As Kayah State is perhaps the most isolated state in Myanmar, it has great difficulties in addressing health concerns.
In 2016, Loikaw General Hospital was upgraded with the 1.945 billion yen funding from Japan International Cooperation Agency (JICA). The following is a summary of the public health care system in the state.

Gallery

See also
Kayah State Cultural Museum

References

External links
Official website

 
States of Myanmar
Members of the Unrepresented Nations and Peoples Organization